The Cadets Drum Corps (formerly the Holy Name Cadets, Cadets of Garfield, Garfield Cadets, and Cadets of Bergen County) is a World Class competitive junior drum and bugle corps. Based in Erie, Pennsylvania, The Cadets was one of the thirteen founding corps of Drum Corps International (DCI), is a ten-time DCI World Champion, and is the oldest continuously active junior drum and bugle corps in North America.

History 
Charles Mura, Michael Koeph, and the Rev. Edwin Garrity of the Holy Name Catholic parish in Garfield, New Jersey founded the Holy Name Cadets Drum and Bugle Corps in 1934 as an activity for the boys in the parish. The corps quickly became one of the top competitive corps in the country. In 1937, the corps song, "O Holy Name", was written for the corps. The lyrics are taught to new members each summer and sung to the tune of "O Tannenbaum".

In 1940, the Cadets won the American Legion Junior National Championship in Boston, the first of a record nine Legion titles the corps would win between 1940 and 1964. The corps was known not only for its talent but for its traveling to compete. In 1950, the Cadets went on the road for three weeks in order to defend their Legion title in Los Angeles.

In 1958, the Holy Name parish declined to support the corps' travel and disbanded the corps. The members and staff, however, were not willing to cease the corps operations, and reorganized as a new organization, even though the parish kept the uniforms and instruments. The corps traveled to Chicago for Legion Nationals at the members' own expense. Marching as the Cadets of Garfield; wearing uniforms of white shorts, red golf shirts, and "Aussie" hats; and using instruments borrowed from the Chicago Cavaliers, the corps managed to finish in second place (one spot ahead of the defending champion Cavaliers). Midway through the 1959 season, the parish allowed the corps to once more wear the uniform that remains their trademark.

In the second half of the Sixties, the Garfield Cadets became more of an also-ran than a champion. In 1969, the corps became coed. In 1971, the Cadets marched a show they called, "No More War"; at VFW Nationals in Dallas. They reportedly tried to convince the VFW officials that the peace symbol in their drill was actually the Mercedes-Benz logo. Also in 1971, the Garfield Cadets, along with the 27th Lancers, Boston Crusaders, Blessed Sacrament Golden Knights, and Blue Rock, formed the United Organization of Junior Corps (also known as the "Alliance"). This action was taken in reaction to the rigid, inflexible rules of the American Legion and VFW (the primary rule makers and sponsors of both corps and shows) and the low or nonexistent performance fees paid for appearing in the various competitions. The corps felt that not only were they having their creative potential as artistic performing groups stifled, but they were being financially starved. (A similar group of Midwestern corps, the Midwest Combine, was formed by the Blue Stars, Cavaliers, Madison Scouts, Santa Clara Vanguard, and the Troopers.) The Alliance members felt that the corps should be making their own rules, operating their own competitions and championships, and keeping the bulk of the monies those shows earned. For the 1971 season, the corps stuck together, offering show promoters the five corps as a package. Despite pressure on show sponsors, judges, and other drum corps, the corps were booked into a number of shows together.

In 1972, the Garfield Cadets, along with the nine other corps from the Alliance and the Midwest Combine, plus the Anaheim Kingsmen, Argonne Rebels, and De La Salle Oaklands were founding members of Drum Corps International, which remains as the sanctioning body for junior corps in North America. At the first DCI World Championships in Whitewater, Wisconsin, the Cadets just missed making Finals and finished in thirteenth place in a competition that featured thirty-nine corps from the East, the South, the West Coast, the Midwest and Great Plains, and Canada. The corps would fail to make DCI Finals for the first three years they were held and for six of DCI's first eight seasons. After their third Finals appearance in 1980, the Cadets quickly regained the corps' former championship form. In 1983–85, the Garfield Cadets became the first DCI corps to earn a three-peat—three consecutive DCI titles. On July 4, 1986 the Cadets performed as a part of the Liberty Weekend celebrating both the hundredth anniversary and the restoration of the Statue of Liberty. In 1987, the corps won its fourth DCI crown in five years.

The Garfield Cadets relocated outside Garfield to Hackensack and became the Cadets of Bergen County in 1989. The Cadets of Bergen County won DCI Championships in 1990, '93, '98, and 2000. In 1996, sponsorship of the corps was passed to Youth Education in the Arts (YEA), an umbrella organization sponsoring several youth and musical activities.  Also in '96, the Cadets performed at the Summer Olympics in Atlanta. In 1998, the corps rebranded once again, dropping any reference to locale from its name and becoming simply The Cadets. In 2003, Yea! moved its base of operations to Allentown, Pennsylvania and The Cadets relocated along with it. In January 2009, The Cadets marched in President Barack Obama's Inaugural Parade in Washington, D.C.  The Cadets won additional DCI championships in 2005 and 2011, the corps' ninth and tenth in forty seasons.

To honor their 75th anniversary, the corps was called the Holy Name Cadets for the 2009 season. The only junior drum and bugle corps older than The Cadets is the Racine Scouts, which was founded in 1927. The Scouts, however, have not competed on the field since 2015, making The Cadets the oldest continuously active junior corps. The Govenaires, an all-age/senior corps founded in 1927, retain the title of oldest continuously active corps.

2018 sexual misconduct allegations 
On April 5, 2018, allegations were made in published reports that the longstanding corps director, George Hopkins, sexually harassed or abused multiple members of the corps and staff over a period of years. Later that day, Hopkins stepped down as director of The Cadets and YEA! CEO while denying the allegations. Sean King was named as interim CEO for YEA! On April 11, the Board of Directors tendered its resignation and a new Board and officers immediately took over operations of the organization. Claiming to have received no letter of resignation, the new board terminated Hopkins for cause. In his federal lawsuit seeking severance pay and other monies, Hopkins asserts that he resigned from the organization by letter on April 5, and that his departure was "mutually agreed"-upon. The organization also hired a Chicago labor and employment law firm, Franczek Radelet, to investigate the accusations against Hopkins as well as YEA!’s policies and procedures for providing a safe environment for youth members, employees, and volunteers. In addition, YEA! established a hotline for calls to report concerns or complaints.

The YEA! organization was immediately put on a probationary status by DCI with the statement that,  "The terms of the probation include multiple steps for YEA! to take in order for its drum corps to participate in the upcoming 2018 DCI Summer Tour." As a part of the terms of probation, the corps' reassessed their planned travel to the West Coast to open the season, and instead decided to proceed with a schedule redrawn for East Coast shows. The corps' compliance with the terms of probation was sufficient for DCI to allow the corps to compete in 2018, and the probation was lifted in May 2019.

On November 13, Hopkins was indicted in Lehigh County, Pennsylvania for sexual assault, based on accusations of two women who are former employees of YEA. The charges are second-degree felonies. Hopkins surrendered to authorities, was arraigned, and was released on $50,000 bail with a preliminary hearing scheduled for December 4. On September 22, 2020, Hopkins pleaded no contest to indecent assault and was sentenced to two years probation and fined $5,000.

In response to Hopkins suing YEA! for more than $650,000 in severance and back pay, the organization filed a counter-suit against the former director for $1.5 million in losses which it alleges to have lost due to the sexual misconduct scandal. This amount of the lawsuit included recovery for lost sponsorships and pledged donations to The Cadets and YEA!, a major loss of participants in the US Bands program, as well as legal fees incurred due to the scandal. Hopkins and YEA! reached a settlement in January 2019.

Organizational Ties
The Cadets was formerly part of Youth Education in the Arts (YEA!), a nonprofit 501(c)(3) organization. In addition to The Cadets, YEA! also sponsored the recently inactive 2016 DCA Champion Cadets2 Drum Corps, 2014 WGI Independent Open Champion Cadets Winter Percussion, and Cadets Winter Guard; USBands (formerly United States Scholastic Band Association); the Urban Arts Center of the Lehigh Valley, which included the Xcape Dance Studio.

The Cadets began operating independently of YEA! as of March 31, 2020. On May 1, 2020, The Cadets announced the creation of a new 501(c)3 non-profit organization: Cadets Arts & Entertainment, Inc. (CAE). A new board of directors was established, led by former CEO and Cadets Director Denise Bonfiglio.

"For 86 years, The Cadets have been leaders and innovators in performing arts education," Bonfiglio said. "We are now opening a new chapter in the storied history of The Cadets by creating a 501(c)(3) nonprofit entity guided by the following founding principles: To educate youth from around the globe on the value of teamwork, inclusiveness, kindness, self-expression, and open communication; To create a safe and inclusive environment for all participants; and To enrich lives by teaching critical development skills required for the pursuit of personal excellence."

With no 2020 drum corps season, Cadets Arts & Entertainment focused its attention on establishing clear policies, strict safeguards and strategic committees that meet regularly to help guide The Cadets forward. Committees were created in the areas of Health and Wellness, Equality and Inclusion, Performing Arts Education, Governance, and Finance.

In 2022, The Cadets entered into a partnership with the Erie Sports Center as the new spring training site for the corps' May-June rehearsals. The City of Erie welcomed The Cadets with open arms, offering access to local business relationships, services, volunteers, and new opportunities for funding and partnerships. In February 2023, CAE announced a long-term partnership with the Erie Sports Center, resulting in a decision to move The Cadets and all operations of CAE to Erie, Pa. The CAE Board of Directors approved this decision on Monday evening, February 13, 2023. Vicki Ferrence Ray, Interim Executive Director of CAE, subsequently signed an agreement to make the Erie Sports Center The Cadets' year-round home.

Show summary (1972–2022)
Source:

Caption awards
At the annual World Championship Finals, Drum Corps International (DCI) presents awards to the corps with the high average scores from prelims, semifinals, and finals in five captions. The Cadets have won these caption awards:

Don Angelica Best General Effect Award
 2000, 2005, 2011
John Brazale Best Visual Performance Award
 2005, 2011
George Zingali Best Color Guard Performance Award
 2005
Jim Ott Best Brass Performance Award
 2000, 2005, 2015
Fred Sanford Best Percussion Performance Award
 2001, 2002, 2003, 2005, 2013

Prior to 2000 and the adoption of the current scoring format, the Cadets won these captions:

High General Effect Award
 1983, 1984, 1985, 1990 (tie), 1992, 1993, 1997, 1998
High Visual Award
 1983, 1984 (tie), 1987 (tie), 1990 (tie), 1993, 1998
High Color Guard Award
 1989, 1991, 1993, 1994, 1996
High Brass Award
 1983, 1984 (3-way tie), 1985 (tie), 1987 (tie), 1995 (3-way tie)
High Percussion Award
 1987, 1990

References

External links
Official website

Culture of Allentown, Pennsylvania
Drum Corps International World Class corps
Musical groups established in 1934
1934 establishments in Pennsylvania